Ranjani Raghavan is an Indian film and television actor and writer. She predominantly acts in Kannada films. She is well known for her role in the Kannada TV series, Putta Gowri Maduve. and Kannadathi.She wrote  book called KATHE DABBI. Which has turned out to be a best seller with more than 15 editions in six months. Her second book ‘Swipe right’ is released on December 7th 2022, selling over 5000 copies in one month, the novel has received youths love and appreciation.

Career 

She is currently acting as the lead in the serial "Kannadathi" opposite Kiran Raj which has gained a good audience. Her explanation of the new 'Kannada terms' at the end of the serial has a separate audience base and has a very good response.

She was born in the year 1994.She started her career with a small role Nagaveni in the mythological serial Keladi chenamma. She then acted in serial Aakasadeepa where she played the role of the protagonist's sister. She was then offered the lead role in the serial Puttagowri maduve, which gave her a huge name and success in small screen. Her role was widely acclaimed among her TV audience. Later she worked as creative director for serial Istadevate and acted in the Malayalam serial Pournami thinkal. Currently she is playing a lead role as Bhuvaneshwari in the serial "Kannadathi".

She has also acted in the film Rajahamsa which received mixed reviews from audience.In 2018 She won Miss India SuperModel from IFM fashion show. In 2022 She won Youth Icon award by RotaryClub Bangalore. And Chittara Rising star award.

Filmography

Television

Awards

References 

Living people
1994 births
Kannada actresses
Actresses from Bangalore
Actresses in Malayalam television